Joaquim Rafael Branco (born 7 September 1953) is a São Toméan politician who was the 16th prime Minister of São Tomé and Príncipe from 2008 to 2010. He is the President of the Movement for the Liberation of São Tomé and Príncipe/Social Democratic Party (MLSTP/PSD).

Life and career
Branco served as Minister of Foreign Affairs from 2000 to 2001. He was Minister of Public Works in July 2003, when he was detained by the military during a briefly successful coup d'etat led by Major Fernando Pereira.

After Prime Minister Patrice Trovoada was defeated in a May 2008 vote of no confidence proposed by the MLSTP/PSD, which was then in opposition, President Fradique de Menezes asked the MLSTP/PSD to form a government in June 2008, and it chose Branco to become the next Prime Minister. Trovoada's Independent Democratic Action (ADI) party denounced Menezes' designation of the MLSTP/PSD to form a government as unconstitutional.

References

|-

1953 births
Foreign Ministers of São Tomé and Príncipe
Government ministers of São Tomé and Príncipe
Living people
Movement for the Liberation of São Tomé and Príncipe/Social Democratic Party politicians
Prime Ministers of São Tomé and Príncipe
20th-century São Tomé and Príncipe politicians
21st-century São Tomé and Príncipe politicians